The Oklahoma State University Library Electronic Publishing Center is located at
103 Oklahoma State University Library Annex Stillwater, Oklahoma 74078, United States.

The Electronic Publishing Center has four important digital collections online:

 Chronicles of Oklahoma;
 Indian Affairs: Laws and Treaties;
 The Proceedings of the Oklahoma Academy of Science;
 Speeches of Boone Pickens.

External links 

 OSU Library Electronic Publishing Center

Library Electronic Publishing Center
American digital libraries